Kermit is a town in Mingo County, West Virginia, United States. The population was 406 at the 2010 census. Kermit is located along the Tug Fork, opposite Warfield, Kentucky. The Norfolk Southern Railway's Kenova District runs through town.

The community was earlier known by the names "Lower Burning Creek", "East Warfield," and "Warfield." The name was changed to "Kermit" when a post office was established in 1906. Kermit was named for Kermit Roosevelt, son of President Theodore Roosevelt, and incorporated in 1909.

Geography
Kermit is located in the northwestern corner of Mingo County at  (37.840783, -82.409465). It primarily occupies bottomland along the eastern bank of the Tug Fork, opposite Warfield, Kentucky. Many of the town's primary municipal buildings and other public buildings lie in a hollow in the northeastern part of town along Main Street and High Street.

U.S. Route 52 (Logan Avenue) traverses Kermit, connecting the town with Williamson to the south and Kenova to the north. A vehicular and pedestrian bridge connects Kermit with Kentucky Route 292 across the Tug Fork in Warfield. The Norfolk Southern railroad tracks run roughly parallel to US-52.

Climate
The climate in this area is characterized by hot, humid summers and generally mild to cool winters. According to the Köppen Climate Classification system, Kermit has a humid subtropical climate, abbreviated "Cfa" on climate maps.

Demographics

The median income for a household in the town was $31,500, and the median income for a family was $40,000. Males had a median income of $36,250 versus $16,250 for females. The per capita income for the town was $14,695. About 4.0% of families and 10.1% of the population were below the poverty line, including 7.0% of those under the age of eighteen and 7.9% of those 65 or over.

2010 census
As of the census of 2010, there were 406 people, 152 households, and 110 families living in the town. The racial makeup of the town was 98.8% White, 0.2% African American, 0.2% Native American, 0.2% Pacific Islander, and 0.5% from two or more races. Hispanic or Latino of any race were 1.2% of the population.

There were 152 households, of which 40.8% had children under the age of 18 living with them, 52.0% were married couples living together, 13.8% had a female householder with no husband present, 6.6% had a male householder with no wife present, and 27.6% were non-families. 24.3% of all households were made up of individuals, and 12.5% had someone living alone who was 65 years of age or older. The average household size was 2.67 and the average family size was 3.20.

The median age in the town was 37.5 years. 26.1% of residents were under the age of 18; 8.2% were between the ages of 18 and 24; 28.4% were from 25 to 44; 24.7% were from 45 to 64; and 12.8% were 65 years of age or older. The gender makeup of the town was 52.5% male and 47.5% female.

See also

 Laurel Lake Wildlife Management Area

References

External links

Towns in Mingo County, West Virginia
Towns in West Virginia
Coal towns in West Virginia